Nicolás Sánchez may refer to:

 Nicolás Sánchez (footballer, born 1986), Argentine defender
 Nicolás Sánchez (footballer, born 1992), Argentine midfielder
 Nicolás Sánchez (footballer, born 1997), Argentine midfielder
 Nicolás Sánchez (rugby union), Argentine fly-half